Juruena is a municipality in the state of Mato Grosso in the Central-West Region of Brazil.

The city is served by Juruena Airport.

See also
List of municipalities in Mato Grosso
Sepotuba River

References

Municipalities in Mato Grosso